The 2018–19 I-League was the 12th season of the I-League, the top Indian professional football league, since its establishment in 2007. The season started on 26 October 2018 and is scheduled to conclude in March 2019. Unlike the Indian Super League, the I-League did not take a mid-season break during the 2019 AFC Asian Cup.

Minerva Punjab was the defending champions having won the previous season. Real Kashmir joined as a promoted club from the I-League 2nd Division. Churchill Brothers, having been relegated the previous season, were given an exemption by the All India Football Federation for this season. 

Chennai City FC were the champions for this season, winning the title on the last day. This was their first title win in the history of the club. The top scorer in the league was Chennai City FC’s Pedro Manzi, who finished the season with 21 goals.

Teams

Stadiums and locations

Personnel and sponsorship

Head coaching changes

Foreign players
On 20 June 2018, it was decided by the All India Football Federation that the number of foreigners for each I-League club will be kept six as previous season. Asian player quota is abolished. Clubs can sign maximum six players of any nationality.

Indian Arrows cannot sign any foreign players as they are the AIFF developmental team.

League table

Results

Season statistics

Scoring

Top scorers

Top Indian scorers

Hat-tricks

Cleansheets

Average home attendances

Awards

Hero of the Match

See also
 2018–19 Indian Super League season

References

External links
 Official website

 
I-League seasons
1
India